Carnbee is a town in Tobago, located about 5 kilometers southwest of Scarborough.

References

Populated places in Tobago